Hugh Piper is an Australian documentary filmmaker and writer/director. He is best known for his documentaries "Dancing With Dictators", "Mr. Sin: The Abe Saffron Story" and Submariners.

Filmography
 Outback Coroner A multi-part series about mysterious and unexplained deaths in remote locations around Australia. 
 "Dancing With Dictators", about Australian publisher Ross Dunkley and his struggles in Burma, set against the background of that country's first election in twenty years.
 "Mr. Sin: The Abe Saffron Story", about the man who brought Sinatra, rock 'n roll, and organized crime to Australia. 
 The Post, about Cambodia's Phnom Penh Post newspaper.
 Double Concerto, about classical music and politics.
 Australia's Outback, a year in the life of an outback cattle station (narrated by Mel Gibson). 
 Cracking The Colour Code, a three-part French-Australian co-production taking a multi-disciplinary approach to examining the science, anthropology, history, and philosophy of colour.
 Submariners, a six-part series about a three-month journey in a Collins-class submarine from Perth, Western Australia to Korea, Japan, and Hawaii. 
 A Case For The Coroner, a six-part series examining the work of the Coroner's Court of New South Wales, State Coroner John Abernethy, and his search for the answers to unexplained deaths.
 Crime Scene Bangkok, about the work of flamboyant forensic scientist Pornthip Rojanasunand, who is fighting entrenched corruption to establish an effective forensic system in Thailand.

References

Year of birth missing (living people)
Living people
Australian film producers